Snelling & Larpenteur is a bus rapid transit station on the A Line in Falcon Heights, Minnesota, United States.  The station is located at the intersection of Larpenteur Avenue on Snelling Avenue. Both station platforms are located far-side of Larpenteur Avenue.  The station opened June 11, 2016 with the rest of the A Line.

Bus connections
Connections to local bus Route 61 can be made on Larpenteur Avenue. Route 84, predecessor to the A Line, stopped at the station until December 1, 2018.

Notable places nearby
Minnesota State Fair

References

External links 
 Metro Transit: Snelling & Larpenteur Station

Bus stations in Minnesota
Transportation in Ramsey County, Minnesota